The Marion County Trail, better known as the MCTrail, is a rail trail located in Marion County, West Virginia.

Near its southwestern trailhead, the trail passes through -long Meredith Tunnel, which is lit.

 Southwest terminus:  Winfield St. in Fairmont, West Virginia
 Northeast terminus:  Intersection with Mon River Trail

It is paved for its entire length and is designated as a multi-use non-motorized trail suitable for biking, horseback riding, running and walking/day hiking.  It has an average 1% grade.

References 

Protected areas of Marion County, West Virginia
Rail trails in West Virginia
Transportation in Marion County, West Virginia